Idols 4 was the fourth season of the Dutch version of Idols hosted by Martijn Krabbé & Wendy van Dijk and held in 2007-2008. The winner was Nikki Kerkhof, with Nathalie Makoma as runner up.

Summaries

Contestants
(ages stated are at time of contest)
(in order of elimination)
Sandy Goeree, 28, from Groningen, Groningen
Ollie Du Croix, 22, from Venlo, Limburg
Asnat Ferdinandus, 26, from Appingedam, Groningen
Mirjam de Jager, 17, from Veldhoven, North Brabant
Bas van Rijckevorsel, 19, from Breda, North Brabant
Tiffany Maes, 20, from Westervoort, Gelderland
Pauline Zurlohe, 35, from Arnhem, Gelderland
Neil Hendriks, 17, from Groningen, Groningen
Nigel Brown, 23, from Amersfoort, Utrecht
Charlene Meulenberg, 19, from Utrecht, Utrecht
Nathalie Makoma, 26, from Rotterdam, South Holland Runner-up
Nikki Kerkhof, 24, from Sint-Oedenrode, North Brabant Winner

Liveshow Themes
Liveshow 1 (December 22, 2007): Las Vegas
Liveshow 2 (December 29, 2007): 80s
Liveshow 3 (January 5, 2008): Dutch Artists
Liveshow 4 (January 12, 2008): Disco
Liveshow 5 (January 19, 2008): Musical
Liveshow 6 (January 26, 2008): Brit Pop
Liveshow 7 (February 2, 2008): Dutch Language
Liveshow 8 (February 9, 2008): Love
Liveshow 9 (February 16, 2008): Big Band
Liveshow 10 (February 23, 2008): Semi Final
Liveshow 11 (March 1, 2008): Final

Judges
Eric van Tijn
John Ewbank
Jerney Kaagman
Gordon

Finals

Live show details

Pre Live Show (15 December 2007)

Notes
The judges selected Asnat Ferdinandus and Mirjam de Jager to move on into the top 12 of the competition.

Live Show 1 (22 December 2007)
Theme: Las Vegas

Live Show 2 (29 December 2007)
Theme: 80s

Live Show 3 (5 January 2008)
Theme: Dutch Artists

Live Show 4 (12 January 2008)
Theme: Disco

Live Show 5 (19 January 2008)
Theme: Musicals

Live Show 6 (26 January 2008)
Theme: Brit Pop

Live Show 7 (2 February 2008)
Theme: Dutch Hits

Live Show 8 (9 February 2008)
Theme: Love Songs

Live Show 9 (16 February 2008)
Theme: Big Band

Live Show 10: Semi-final (23 February 2008)

Live final (1 March 2008)

Season 04
2007 Dutch television seasons
2008 Dutch television seasons